Thomas Randle (born 7 April 1996) is an Australian racing driver. He currently races in the Supercars Championship for Tickford Racing in the No. 55 Ford Mustang GT. Randle has also won the 2014 Australian Formula Ford Series, 2017 Toyota Racing Series and 2020 Super2 Series. In 2018, he was awarded the Mike Kable Young Gun Award and in 2020, The BRDC Innes Ireland Trophy.

Career

Karting
Prior to his single-seater career, Randle enjoyed a successful period in karting in his native Australia. In 2012, he won Junior Clubman class of the Australian National Sprint Kart Championship and Rotax Junior class of the Australian Rotax Nationals.

Formula Ford and Formula 4
Randle made his single-seater debut in 2013, racing in the Australian Formula Ford Championship for the Evans Motorsport Group. He finished seventh with two podiums and another thirteen point-scoring finishes. He switched to Dream Motorsport in 2014. He clinched the championship title, winning five races with just four-point advantage to Jordan Lloyd.

Randle continued his collaboration with Dream Motorsport into the new-for-2015 Australian Formula 4 Championship. He again battled with Lloyd for the championship, but this time he finished as runner-up and was outscored by 54 points and five wins.

Formula 3
For 2016, Randle moved to Europe to compete in the BRDC British Formula 3 Championship, racing for Douglas Motorsport. He won races at Rockingham and Spa and finished fourth in the drivers' standings.

Formula V8 3.5
In 2016 Randle made his debut in Formula V8 3.5 in the Jerez round with Comtec Racing.

Eurocup Formula Renault 2.0
In 2017 Randle switched to the Eurocup Formula Renault 2.0, partaking with AVF by Adrián Vallés. He finished 9 of his 16 races in points (his best finish was the fourth place at Red Bull Ring). He ended season fourteenth.

Super2 Series
In 2018 Randle moved to the Dunlop Super2 Series to race with Tickford Racing in a Ford FG X Falcon.
Thomas Randle has joined illustrious company in being crowned champion of the 2020 Dunlop Super2 Series.

S5000 Championship
In 2021 Randle left the Super2 Series and moved to the Australian S5000 Championship to race with Team BRM in a Onroak Ligier JS F3-S5000. after he couldn't find a ride for 2021 Super2 season.

Personal life
Randle was diagnosed with testicular cancer in January 2020.

He has a business called Dream Simulation which helps drivers to hone their skills in Supercars racing.

He plays volleyball in his spare time.

He is a university student.

Racing record

Career summary

† As Randle was a guest driver, he was ineligible for points.
* Season still in progress.

Complete Formula V8 3.5 Series results
(key) (Races in bold indicate pole position) (Races in italics indicate fastest lap)

Super2 Series results
(key) (Round results only),
(2020 Race results only)

Supercars Championship results

Complete Bathurst 1000 results

Complete S5000 results

References

External links

V8 Supercars Official Profile
Profile on Racing Reference

1996 births
Living people
Racing drivers from Melbourne
Formula Ford drivers
Toyota Racing Series drivers
Supercars Championship drivers
BRDC British Formula 3 Championship drivers
World Series Formula V8 3.5 drivers
Formula Renault Eurocup drivers
Formula Renault 2.0 NEC drivers
Double R Racing drivers
Comtec Racing drivers
AV Formula drivers
Australian F4 Championship drivers